Rochester railway station is on the Chatham Main Line in Kent, England.

Rochester railway station or Rochester station may also refer to:
 Rochester railway station, Victoria in Victoria, Australia
 Louise M. Slaughter Rochester Station in Rochester, New York
 Erie Railroad Depot (Rochester, New York) in Rochester, New York